Castillon-de-Castets (Gascon: Castilhon de Castèths) is a former commune in the Gironde department in Nouvelle-Aquitaine in southwestern France. On 1 January 2017, it was merged into the new commune Castets et Castillon.

Population

See also
Communes of the Gironde department

References

Former communes of Gironde